Oscar Cooper may refer to:

 Oscar Henry Cooper, president of Baylor University, 1899–1902
 Oscar James Cooper, African-American physician and cultural leader